The Midland Counties Football Union was a governing body for rugby union in The Midlands, England from 1879-1920.

History 
The organisation was formed as the Midland Counties Football Club and covered the counties of Derbyshire, Leicestershire, Lincolnshire, Northamptonshire, Nottinghamshire, Staffordshire, Warwickshire and Worcestershire. The Midland Counties representative team played in the County Championship from its inception in 1888 until 1920. The main club event was the Midland Counties Challenge Cup which continued to run until 1926.

Disbandment
Up until and following the disbandment in 1920, the union broke up and distributed its assets to the following  unions:
North Midlands Rugby Football Union
Leicestershire Rugby Union
Warwickshire Rugby Football Union

The North Midlands was given responsibility for clubs sides based in Birmingham and the West Midlands, Herefordshire, Staffordshire, Shropshire and Worcestershire, most of which were sub-members under the North Midlands umbrella (the Staffordshire RU would later achieve full RFU membership in 1962).  The Leicestershire and Warwickshire unions became full county constituents in their own right.

Club sides that had been based in Derbyshire, Lincolnshire and Nottinghamshire would later join the Notts, Lincs & Derbyshire Rugby Football Union (created 1926).

Honours
1913–14 Rugby Union County Championship winners

Midland Counties Cup
The Midland Counties Cup was inaugurated during the 1880-81 season and held for the first time the following season.

Past winners

+ Result declared null and void. The competition was discontinued after 1925-26.

Number of wins
Leicester Tigers (12)
Coventry (9)
Moseley (9)
Burton-on-Trent (2)
Nuneaton (2)
Newbold-on-Avon (1)
Nottingham (1)
Old Edwardians (1)
Stratford-on-Avon (1)

Notes

References 

Rugby union governing bodies in England
1879 establishments in England
Sports organizations established in 1879
1920 disestablishments in England